Florent Peyre (born 14 May 1980) is a French comedian. He is known for participating in Laurent Ruquier's sketch comedy show On n'demande qu'à en rire.

Filmography
 2016 : Storks : Junior (French voice)
 2017 : Raid dingue : Olivier Lopez
 2021 : Flashback : Napoleon Bonaparte

References

External links
 
 

1980 births
French comedians
Living people
People from Valence, Drôme
French humorists
French male writers